Gort na Móna Secondary School was a private Catholic secondary school for boys aged 11–16, located in Belfast, County Antrim, Northern Ireland. It opened in September 1971 with 120 pupils. In 1988, the school amalgamated with St Thomas's Secondary School, St Peter's Secondary School, and St Paul's Secondary School to become Corpus Christi College, Belfast. The first school premises were located at the current Gort na Móna GAC site in Turf Lodge and consisted of a series of wooden huts while construction of the main building took place.

In 2019, Corpus Christi College amalgamated with St Rose's Dominican College and the Christian Brothers School, Glen Road. The new school is called All Saints College / Coláiste na Naomh Uile.

Facilities 

Purpose-built buildings were opened in 1973, on a green field site with space for sports pitches and playing fields. Three open-air handball courts were added to the side of the building at the Dermott Hill entrance. The school continued to expand and in 1980 there were 36 teachers and 550 pupils. One building housed the classrooms where Science, Irish language, Maths, Geography, Religion, English, Music, Art, Technology and Design were taught. The Sports Halls was located in the other building. Today the buildings are now used by St Gerard's Education Centre.

Uniform
The uniform policy consisted of a black blazer, grey shirt, grey jumper, maroon tie with thin saffron line, black trousers and black shoes; however, this policy was lightly enforced by staff and after pupils entered their second year they could wear almost any attire except jeans.

Sport
As a school run by the Congregation of Christian Brothers it had strong Gaelic Athletic Association ties. Gaelic football, handball and hurling were encouraged and developed, leaving a legacy in the surrounding housing estates of Dermott Hill, New Barnsley and Turf Lodge.

Brother T.F. Moroney was responsible for the development for the teams and choose the dominant maroon colour of Galway GAA as well as sky blue and saffron for the school team colours. Funding for the school kits and hurly sticks came from profits gained from the school tuck shop. Moroney later helped found Gort na Móna GAC in 1974.

References

Defunct Catholic schools in Northern Ireland
1971 establishments in Northern Ireland
Educational institutions established in 1971
1988 disestablishments in Northern Ireland
Educational institutions disestablished in 1988
Boys' schools in Northern Ireland
Secondary schools in Belfast
Congregation of Christian Brothers secondary schools in Northern Ireland